As a part of the defunct Europa Jupiter System Mission – Laplace (EJSM-Laplace), the Jupiter Europa Orbiter (JEO) was a proposed orbiter probe slated for lift-off in 2020 and planned for detailed studies of Jupiter's moons Europa and Io as well as the Jovian magnetosphere. Its main goal would have been to look for evidence of a possible subsurface ocean.

In June 2015, a more economical mission, the Europa Multiple-Flyby Mission (Europa Clipper) was approved by NASA and entered the formulation stage.

See also 

 Europa Orbiter (former NASA plan cancelled in 2002).
 Europa Clipper (the next mission plan for Europa, non-nuclear orbiter for Jupiter doing Europa flybys).
 Europa Lander (NASA) (stand-alone mission for NASA Europa Lander) (Note: there was also a concept for a Europa Clipper add-on lander).

References 

NASA programs
Proposed NASA space probes
Europa Jupiter System Mission – Laplace
Europa (moon)